The Kawanishi K-10 Transport was a 1920s Japanese passenger and mail transport.  Two were built, one briefly serving a route between cities in Japan, Korea and China.

Design and development

The K-10 was designed by Eiji Sekiguchi to carry passengers and mail on the challenging, over-water Osaka- Seoul - Dalian (Derien) route. In the 1920s these cities were Japanese possessions.

It was a single bay biplane with a fabric-covered wooden structure. The wings were rectangular in plan out to rounded tips and braced together with a pair of parallel interplane struts on each side. The wing centre-section and fuselage were joined by two N--form cabane struts.

Originally the K-10 was powered by a  V12 Lorraine 12D engine driving a four-bladed propeller. Its two passengers sat side-by-side in an open cockpit ahead of the pilot. Room was found for four passenger seats in an enclosed cabin between the wings. The fuselage was flat-sided, with rounded decking, and the tail was conventional, with a blunted rectangular fin and narrow, rectangular rudder.

It had fixed, conventional landing gear with wheels on a single axle. Both faired drag struts and slender legs, fitted with conspicuous, square shock absorbers, were mounted on the lower fuselage.

Operational history

The first of two K-10s was completed in August 1926 and made its first flight soon after. In September it joined the sole Kawanishi K-7B carrying mail on the Osaka - Seoul - Dalian (Derien) route, completing six of these tours before retirement.

Soon after, on 2 October 1926, it appeared at the Kansai Aviation Day display, carrying passengers to enhance Japanese aviation awareness.

Operators
Nippon Koku KK

Specifications (Maybach engine)

References

Biplanes
Single-engined tractor aircraft
1920s Japanese civil aircraft
Mailplanes
K-10